Alice Cleveland is a former television home shopping host on HSN and most recently an on-air vendor representative on QVC.

She was fired from HSN shortly after being diagnosed with myasthenia gravis, a neuromuscular disease; HSN maintained that her dismissal was based on the network's dissatisfaction with her hosting style, and because she appeared in an unauthorized infomercial on another station.  A court awarded Cleveland $495,000 in actual and punitive damages, believing Cleveland's claim that she lost her job because of her illness, which would be a violation of the Americans with Disabilities Act.

External links
Jury verdict on TV firing reasonable, court rules St. Petersburg Times

References

Year of birth missing (living people)
Living people
American television personalities
American women television personalities
American infotainers
Place of birth missing (living people)